Tropical Heat (known as Sweating Bullets in the United States) is a Canadian action series that aired between 1991 and 1993. In the U.S., the show eventually aired as part of the CBS umbrella series Crimetime After Primetime which aired before the premiere of the Late Show with David Letterman on CBS in 1993. The series ran for three seasons totaling 66 episodes. 

Season one of the series was filmed in Puerto Vallarta, Mexico due to tax breaks the production was eligible for under the budding North American Free Trade Agreement (NAFTA). Season two was filmed in Eilat, Israel. Season three was filmed in Pretoria, South Africa, with some sequences shot on the Isle of Mauritius.

Series overview

Episodes

Season 1 (1991)

Season 2 (1991–92)

Season 3 (1992–93)

Notes

References

External links 
 
 

Tropical Heat